The 2021 MercedesCup was a men's tennis tournament played on outdoor grass courts. It was the 43rd edition of the Stuttgart Open, and part of the ATP Tour 250 series of the 2021 ATP Tour. It was held at the Tennis Club Weissenhof in Stuttgart, Germany, from 8 June until 13 June 2021. Unseeded Marin Čilić won the singles title.

Champions

Singles 

  Marin Čilić def.  Félix Auger-Aliassime, 7–6(7–2), 6–3

Doubles 

  Marcelo Demoliner /  Santiago González def.  Ariel Behar /  Gonzalo Escobar, 4–6, 6–3, [10–8]

Points and prize money

Point distribution

Prize money 

*per team

ATP singles main draw entrants

Seeds

1 Rankings are as of 31 May 2021.

Other entrants
The following players received wildcards into the main draw:
  Dustin Brown 
  Yannick Hanfmann 
  Rudolf Molleker 
  Jurij Rodionov 
  Dominic Stricker 

The following players received entry from the qualifying draw:
  Radu Albot
  Altuğ Çelikbilek
  James Duckworth
  Peter Gojowczyk

The following player received entry as a lucky loser:
  Ilya Ivashka

Withdrawals 
Before the tournament
  Alexander Bublik → replaced by  Alexei Popyrin
  Taylor Fritz → replaced by  Marin Čilić
  Cristian Garín → replaced by  Jordan Thompson
  Aslan Karatsev → replaced by  Jérémy Chardy
  Reilly Opelka → replaced by  Lloyd Harris
  Benoît Paire → replaced by  Sam Querrey
  Milos Raonic → replaced by  Márton Fucsovics
  Jannik Sinner → replaced by  Dominik Koepfer
  Lorenzo Sonego → replaced by  Guido Pella
  Jan-Lennard Struff → replaced by  Feliciano López
  Stan Wawrinka → replaced by  Ilya Ivashka
  Alexander Zverev → replaced by  Gilles Simon

Retirements 
  Peter Gojowczyk

ATP doubles main draw entrants

Seeds

1 Rankings are as of 31 May 2021.

Other entrants
The following pairs received wildcards into the doubles main draw:
  Andre Begemann /  Dustin Brown 
  Yannick Hanfmann /  Dominik Koepfer

The following pairs received entry as alternates:
  Félix Auger-Aliassime /  Nicholas Monroe
  Nikoloz Basilashvili /  Divij Sharan
  Ariel Behar /  Gonzalo Escobar
  Marcelo Demoliner /  Santiago González
  Máximo González /  Andrés Molteni
  Hubert Hurkacz /  Łukasz Kubot
  Oliver Marach /  Aisam-ul-Haq Qureshi
  Frederik Nielsen /  Jean-Julien Rojer
  Luke Saville /  Jordan Thompson

Withdrawals
Before the tournament
  Rohan Bopanna /  Franko Škugor → replaced by  Oliver Marach /  Aisam-ul-Haq Qureshi
  Alexander Bublik /  Reilly Opelka → replaced by  Ariel Behar /  Gonzalo Escobar
  Sander Gillé /  Joran Vliegen → replaced by  Máximo González /  Andrés Molteni
  Wesley Koolhof /  Jean-Julien Rojer → replaced by  Frederik Nielsen /  Jean-Julien Rojer
  Sebastian Korda /  Rajeev Ram → replaced by  Marcelo Demoliner /  Santiago González
  Kevin Krawietz /  John Peers → replaced by  Félix Auger-Aliassime /  Nicholas Monroe
  Łukasz Kubot /  Marcelo Melo → replaced by  Hubert Hurkacz /  Łukasz Kubot
  Adrian Mannarino /  Benoît Paire → replaced by  Nikoloz Basilashvili /  Divij Sharan
  Tim Pütz /  Michael Venus → replaced by  Luke Saville /  Jordan Thompson

During the tournament
  Yannick Hanfmann /  Dominik Koepfer

References

External links 
 
 ATP tournament profile

Stuttgart Open
Stuttgart Open
2021 in German tennis
MercedesCup